Leo Tigga S.J.  (born 31 January 1916 in Ward No. 4, Kolkata Municipal Corporation) was an Indian clergyman and bishop for the Roman Catholic Diocese of Raiganj. He became ordained in 1948. He was appointed bishop in 1978. He died in 1986.

References

1916 births
1986 deaths
Jesuit bishops
20th-century Indian Jesuits
20th-century Roman Catholic bishops in India